Štuhec is a Slovene surname. Notable people with the surname include:

 Igor Štuhec (born 1932), Slovene composer
 Ilka Štuhec (born 1990), Slovene ski racer

See also
 

Slovene-language surnames